Froukje Veenstra (born 4 September 2001), better known by her stage name Froukje, is a Dutch singer-songwriter.

Early life 

Froukje Veenstra was born into a family of teachers, for whom music always played a central role. She used to play in the band Ginger Squad together with her father and her sister and later in other bands, including Chicks & Wings. In the late 2010s she enrolled at the Rotterdam Conservatory of Music. Her studies were disrupted from 2020 onward by the COVID-19 pandemic. Over the course of the pandemic, she was also unable to perform in front of an audience.

Career 

Her first song "Groter Dan Ik", a protest song about the climate crisis, was released in early 2020. The song had been streamed 1.7 million times in less than one year. Later that year, her second song "Ik wil dansen" was released. With this single, she entered the Dutch Single Top 100 for the first time. In January 2021, her first EP  Licht en donker was released. It reached the second position in the Dutch Album Top 100.

In 2022 her second EP Uitzinnig was released. Later that year she performed at Pinkpop Festival.

Musical style 

Veenstra composes her own music with the help of a laptop, a guitar or a keyboard. Lyrically she is influenced by Maarten van Roozendaal and Theo Nijland. She is also inspired by Eefje de Visser, Typhoon and Stromae.

Discography

Extended plays

Singles

References

2001 births
21st-century Dutch women singers
21st-century Dutch singers
Dutch singer-songwriters
Dutch-language singers
Living people